Takapuna is an amateur football club based in Takapuna, New Zealand. They compete in the Northern League.

History
The club was founded as Takapuna City AFC in 1964 as a junior club, with the first senior men's teams being added in 1967. By 1971 they were playing in the Northern league first division, a competition which they won at their first attempt. They entered the New Zealand National Soccer League for the first time in 1981 but only lasted one season before being relegated. Their best results in the Chatham Cup was making the semi-finals in 1980 and 1999.

References

External links
Club website

Association football clubs in Auckland
1964 establishments in New Zealand